Syöjätär, sometimes referred to as an "ogress", is a character in Finnish folklore. She is associated with the origin of some diseases, as well as unpleasant (or useless) creatures such as the snake, lizard, or wolf. In some folktales she takes the role of wicked mother.

Description

Origin
A possible origin story is given in a song describing the "Origin of Injuries caused by Spells", which contains some post-Christian elements: Louhiatar wife of Pohja becomes pregnant whilst sleeping with her back to the wind, impregnated by a blast of wind... After more than nine months the woman seeks to give birth but can find no good place to do so - then god (Ukko) speaks to her from a cloud indicating that a "three cornered shed is on the swamp, on the shore facing the sea in gloomy Pohjola [...] go thither to be confined, to lighten thy womb..." - she gives birth to nine sons, and one girl. God (the Christian "Maker") refuses to baptise them, as does "Juhannes, the holy knight" (John the Baptist) - Louhitar then baptises them herself, giving them names (they become disease principles) - one of her boys, who lacks a mouth or eyes remains unnamed, and she sends him away to the Rutja rapids, from him were said to originate sharp frosts, sorcerers and wizards, jealous persons, and the creatures called Syöjätärs.

In other origin myths
As with other mythic entities in the "songs" Syöjätär's name is used in allusions or figurative reference to creatures, objects, and concepts - she is generally imbued with negative connotations:

In a spell against syphilis the disease is called the progeny of Syöjätär; in a spell against "tooth worm" (Hammasmato, gnawer of teeth and bones, was believed to be the cause of tooth decay and infections) the creature's origin is given as coming indirectly from the work of Syöjätär:

Together with Hiisi she is a key element in the creation myth of Snakes - in the story Hiisi's sleep drool is swallowed by Syöjätär, but it burns her and she spits it out.. after being blown by the wind, it lands and dries, Hiisi then brings it to life. In other variants it is Syöjätär's spit, but Hiisi still brings it to life. She is also involved in the creation of the Lizard - she spits on the sea that forms a bubble - the bubble is swallowed by the girl Kasaritar (or Kasarikki) who becomes pregnant for three years, then gives birth to a Lizard. A similar creation story for the Wolf again involves Syöjätär spitting on the sea - then Kuolatar appears from the sea on a bare island - this creature rubs its palms to create some land whereon the wolf was reared.

In a song describing the origin of stone, it is described as the heart's core of Syöjätär, amongst several other allusions; she is also the originator of the Fir tree (in one version), together with Maajatar, Pellervoinen, and Naservainen who develop it.

In a song for the purpose "To Still Violence" Syöjätär is referenced as the "Ogress", and is given as an element in the consumption of persons consumed by violence or anger:

In the Kalevala
Syöjätär is mentioned in passing in the Finnish epic, the Kalevala, but does not appear herself - in Rune XV a reference to the creation of the snake from her spit is found; and in Rune XXVI a similar (and longer) description of the formation of a snake from her spit is given.

In other folk tales
Syöjätär appears in several folk tales, recorded in the Suomen kansan Satuja ja Tarinoita (4 parts) edited by Eero Salmelainen (:fi:Eero Salmelainen).

In Saaressa eläjät, a tale about three sisters who seek to marry the King, she appears as a wicked mother who replaces newborn children with animals so that her own daughter can marry the king.

From a German translation in :
 
... The youngest sister says she will bear three times three sons, and is chosen - she becomes pregnant and when the time comes for her to give birth she sends her husband to fetch a midwife. On the way he is met by a woman (unbeknown to him it is Syöjätär) - when left along with the woman and her three children she swaps them for three dogs... the same happens the next time the woman becomes pregnant, this time Syöjätär swaps the three children for pigs... a third time she becomes pregnant, and again the Syöjätär comes - this time she recognizes her and hides one child in her breast, the other two are swapped for lap dogs. The husband's (king's) patience expires and he puts them in an iron case with one of the lap dogs and throws it in the sea - eventually the cask washes ashore. Deserted on an island surrounded by salt water the boy prays to god, and god provides a fabulous house, food from a magic tree, and a bridge to the mainland. Eventually tales of the place reach the prince, and he plans to set out to see it.

However he has since married a daughter of Syojatar, who tries to prevent him going, telling of marvels she has - first three pigs, then six stallions - each time the boy drives the creatures off. Finally the prince's new wife says she has eight golden boys sleeping on a smooth lawn by a large stone covered with red cloth. The boy says he would like to fetch those too - his mother tells him first she must make him food - she makes eight cakes from flour and her breast milk, and tells her son to give one to each boy. He does this and the boys wake up - they are his eight brothers - he returns with them. The king visits the stone but finds nothing and returns to his new wife disappointed, telling her he now intends to visit the island. There he is warmly welcomed by his nine sons and former wife - they are reunited and tell him their story.

The king returns to his castle and orders hot stones put in pit in the bath house, and covered with a cloth - then his new wife, daughter of Syöjätär is taken to bathe - she hops into the bath-house and falls into the pit, and is burnt. The king as his former wife and sons are reunited and return to live in the king's castle.

Syöjätär also appears in other stories in the same collection of tales. In Part 1: Mikko Mieheläinen; Ihmeellinen koiwu; Kummallinen tammi; Merestä-nousija neito; Weljiänsä etsijät ja joutsenina lentäjät; Neitonen kuninkaan sadussa; and Weljiänsä-etsijä tyttö, and in Part 2: Leppäpölkky; and Awannolla kehrääjät.

Similar folklorish figures
Together with ajatar (huntress) and akka (old woman), Syöjätär fills similar roles in Finnish folklore as does Baba Yaga in Russian lore. There are also some similarities between Syöjätär and Russian folklore depiction of the devil – such as both being the origin of creatures like snakes and toads. Syöjätär lacks the positive side of the ambiguous Baba Yaga – this role is fulfilled by akka in Finnish myth.

References

Sources

, 4 parts, e-text via www.gutenberg.org

Finnish mythology
Finnish folklore
Finnish legendary creatures